Heaven Can Wait is a 1943 Technicolor American comedy film produced and directed by Ernst Lubitsch. The music score was by Alfred Newman and the cinematography by Edward Cronjager.

The film tells the story of a man who has to prove he belongs in Hell by telling his life story. It stars Gene Tierney, Don Ameche, and Charles Coburn. The supporting cast includes Marjorie Main, Laird Cregar, Spring Byington, Allyn Joslyn, Eugene Pallette, Signe Hasso, Louis Calhern, Tod Andrews, and Clara Blandick.

Plot
An aged Henry Van Cleve enters the opulent reception area of "where innumerable people had told him so often to go", to be personally greeted by "His Excellency". Henry petitions to be admitted (fully aware of the kind of life he has led), but  some doubt exists as to his qualifications. To prove his worthiness (or rather unworthiness), he begins to tell the story of his dissolute life.

Born in Manhattan on October 25, 1872, Henry is the spoiled only child of stuffy, naive, wealthy parents Randolph and Bertha. His paternal grandmother is also doting and naive, although his down-to-earth grandfather Hugo Van Cleve, a self-made millionaire, understands Henry quite well. Henry grows up to be an idle young man with a taste for attractive showgirls. One day, Henry overhears a beautiful woman lying to her mother on a public telephone. Intrigued, he follows her into a Brentano's bookstore and pretends to be an employee to get to know her better. Despite learning that she is engaged to marry, he begins making advances, finally confessing he does not work there, whereupon she hastily departs.

Later, his obnoxious cousin Albert introduces the family to his fiancée, Martha, and her feuding parents, the Strables. Henry is shocked to find that his mystery woman and Martha are one and the same. It turns out that Albert was the first suitor of whom both her parents approved. Fearful of spending the rest of her life as a spinster in Kansas City, Martha agreed to marry him. Henry convinces her to elope with him instead. Though everyone except Grandpa Van Cleve is scandalized, eventually they are received back into the family.

Henry and Martha enjoy a happy marriage and become the proud parents of a boy. On the eve of their tenth anniversary, however, Martha finds out about what appears to be Henry's continuing dalliances with other women and goes back to her parents. Henry and Grandpa follow her there. Sneaking into the Strable house, Henry corrects the misunderstanding, begs her forgiveness, and talks her into "eloping" a second time, much to Grandpa's delight.

Fifteen years later, Henry meets chorus girl Peggy Nash in her dressing room shortly before her performance. What seems to be an attempt at courtship is soon revealed as an attempt by Henry to turn her away from his son, Jack, who has been dating her. When Peggy reveals her knowledge of his true identity, Henry buys her off, instead, for $25,000 (equivalent to about $ in ). Jack later reveals he was glad to have got rid of her so easily.

Martha passes away shortly after their 25th anniversary. Henry resumes an active social life much to the amusement of his son. On October 26, 1942, the day after his 70th birthday, Henry dies under the care of a beautiful nurse, her coming having been portended in a dream. After hearing Henry's story, His Excellency denies him entry and suggests he try the "other place", where Martha and his grandfather are waiting for him, hinting that there may be "a small room vacant in the annex".

Cast

Reception
A contemporary review by Bosley Crowther in The New York Times described the film as "certainly one you'll want to see" and "a comedy of manners, edged with satire, in the slickest Lubitsch style" that "is poking very sly and sentimental fun at Eighteen Nineties naughtiness," adding that although the "picture has utterly no significance. Indeed, it has very little point, except to afford entertainment [...] it does [that] quite well." The review also notes that "Don Ameche and Gene Tierney are flat in the roles. Or rather, they lack the flexibility which such mannered comedy demands." A review of the film in Variety reported that it features "generous slices of comedy, skillfully handled by producer-director Ernst Lubitsch [who] has endowed it with light, amusing sophistication and heart-warming nostalgia," noting that "Charles Coburn as the fond grandfather [...] walks away with the early sequences in a terrific comedy performance." Writing in Turner Classic Movies, critic David Kalat described the film as "a representative example of its time: It's a costume drama that luxuriates in period detail" and "a character study told with inventive narrative techniques and non-chronological structure."  

The film made a profit of $1,286,200.

Awards and nominations

Preservation
Heaven Can Wait was preserved by the Academy Film Archive in 2015.

References

External links
 
 
 
 
 
 
Heaven Can Wait: The Simple Act of Living an essay by William Paul at the Criterion Collection
 Bowman, James. Diary of June 29, 2011 introductory address on the film
Streaming audio
 Heaven Can Wait on Lux Radio Theater: October 11, 1943
 Heaven Can Wait on Screen Guild Theater: May 7, 1945
 Heaven Can Wait on Theater of Romance: August 21, 1945

1943 films
1940s fantasy comedy-drama films
20th Century Fox films
American fantasy comedy-drama films
1940s English-language films
Films scored by Alfred Newman
Films about the afterlife
American films based on plays
Films directed by Ernst Lubitsch
Films set in 1872
Films set in 1881
Films set in 1887
Films set in 1898
Films set in 1908
Films set in 1923
Films set in 1932
Films set in 1942
1943 comedy films
1943 drama films
Hugo Award for Best Dramatic Presentation, Long Form winning works
1940s American films